Chi Girl is a 1999 black-and-white mockumentary produced, directed, written by, and starring Heidi Van Lier. The story follows Heather, an unlikable woman who makes a bet with a filmmaker that she can sleep with any man she wants at any time. The film was shown at a number of film festivals including Slamdance Film Festival, Cleveland International Film Festival,  New York Underground Film Festival, Edinburgh International Film Festival, and Chicago Alt.film Festival. Chi Girl was low-budget and was made on less than $50,000, which Van Lier borrowed from her mother.

Synopsis
Heather Green (Van Lier) is a Chicago newspaper columnist who makes a bet with a filmmaker, Randy, that she can sleep with any man she wants, whenever she wants because she theorizes that all men crave sex. Randy films her unsuccessful attempts to prove her theory right, as well as her stalking her ex-boyfriend. Over the course of the movie, Randy begins to fall in love with Heather. When Heather finds a boyfriend, Cliff, and tells Randy filming is over, he begins to stalk her. She repeatedly tells him to leave her alone. Heather once again allows Randy to film after Cliff breaks up with her but this time he has to record without sound. At the end of the movie, Heather boards a train to an unknown destination. Randy watches her leave and decides to wait for her return.

Cast
 Heidi Van Lier as Heather Green
 Joe Kraemer as Randy (voice)
 Scott Benjaminson as  Cliff 
 Phil Smith as Jack
 Alicia Hyde as Marie
 Sarah Willis as Kelly
 Troy West as Jeff
 Bret Grafton as Jacob
 Jill Kraft as Michelle
 Paul Jeans as George
 Cherise Silvestri as a Jennie
 Stephanie Caterer as a Jennie
 Erinn Haynes as a Jennie

Accolades

External links

References

American independent films
Films scored by Joe Kraemer
1990s mockumentary films
American mockumentary films
1990s English-language films
1999 films
1990s American films